Gallions Reach is a stretch of the River Thames between Woolwich and Thamesmead. The area is named for the Galyons, a 14th-century family who owned property along this stretch of the river, and places, including street names, on both sides have been named after it.

North side
North of the Thames in the London Borough of Newham, there is Gallions Reach Shopping Park and the DLR station.

South side
South of the Thames in the London Borough of Greenwich, Gallions Hill is an area between the river and Western Way, close to Thamesmead town centre, Gallions Reach Park exists near the modern Thamesmead housing estate.

Transport
Gallions was the eastern terminus station of the Eastern Counties and Thames Junction Railway from 1880 to 1940. Gallions Reach DLR station opened in 1994 on the route to Beckton.

There is a proposal for a river crossing at Gallions Reach.

References

Bodies of water of London